Natasha McKay (born 14 January 1995) is a Scottish figure skater who competes in ladies' singles for Great Britain. She is the 2018 Golden Bear of Zagreb champion, the 2017 Skate Helena champion, the 2017 Open d'Andorra champion, and a six-time British national champion (2017–2020, 2022–23).

Personal life 
McKay was born on 14 January 1995 in Dundee, Scotland. She attended St John's School in Dundee before moving, around 2008, to Coventry, England. She returned to Dundee by 2012.

Career 
McKay began learning to skate in 2002. In a 2018 interview, she recalled, "I begged my mum for skates for a whole year [...] until she gave in."

McKay won the junior bronze medal at the British Championships in the 2009–10 season. In February 2011, she placed 22nd at the European Youth Olympic Festival in Liberec, Czech Republic. She was coached by Yuri Bureiko in Coventry.

In the 2012–13 season, McKay made her only appearance on the ISU Junior Grand Prix series, placing 24th in Bled, Slovenia, and won her second junior national bronze medal. She was coached by Debi and Simon Briggs in Dundee, Scotland.

She won the senior bronze medal at the British Championships in the 2014–15 season and finished 5th the following year.

McKay won gold at the Open d'Andorra in November 2016 and became the British national champion the following month. In January 2017, she took gold at Skate Helena. She was named in the British team to the 2017 European Championships in Ostrava. In the Czech Republic, she ranked 24th in the short program, giving her the final qualifying spot, and then rose to 18th overall by placing 16th in the free skate.

In December 2018, McKay won her third consecutive national title.  

At the 2019 World Championships, McKay qualified for the free skate for the first time and placed twenty-first overall.

British champion for a fourth time in 2020, McKay was assigned to compete at the World Championships in Montreal, but these were cancelled as a result of the coronavirus pandemic.

With the lockdowns in Britain greatly affecting the availability of ice time, McKay temporarily relocated to Bradford in West Yorkshire during the summer of 2020 until the Scottish government revised its guidelines. McKay was named to the British team for the 2021 European Championships, but they were cancelled as a result of the ongoing pandemic. Additional lockdown measures introduced by the Scottish government after Christmas resulted in her only being able to train four days a week, an hour and a half a day. Competing at the 2021 World Championships in Stockholm, McKay placed twenty-third. This result qualified a place for Great Britain at the 2022 Winter Olympics in Beijing.

McKay was fifteenth at the 2021 CS Finlandia Trophy to begin the Beijing Olympic season. After winning another British national title, she was named to the British Olympic team. She said it "means everything to me to get to the Olympics – I've been dreaming of this since I was a little girl watching it on television." Before the Games, she finished seventeenth at the 2022 European Championships. McKay was twenty-eighth in the short program of the Olympic women's event, and did not advance to the free skate. She then finished twenty-third at the 2022 World Championships.

Originally intending to retire after the Olympics, McKay opted to continue for at least one more season, citing the time lost due to the pandemic. She was sixteenth at the 2022 CS Finlandia Trophy to begin the season. Following the cancellation of the Cup of China as a result of Chinese pandemic measures, McKay had the unique opportunity to participate in a Grand Prix on home soil when British Ice Skating hosted the 2022 MK John Wilson Trophy in Sheffield. She called the event "the last thing on my skating bucket list," noting it was "the biggest competition I've ever done on home ice."

Programs

Competitive highlights 
GP: Grand Prix; CS: Challenger Series; JGP: Junior Grand Prix

2016-17 to Present

Earlier Career

References

External links 
 

1995 births
Scottish female single skaters
Living people
Sportspeople from Dundee
Figure skaters at the 2022 Winter Olympics
Olympic figure skaters of Great Britain
Olympic athletes of Great Britain